Minqing County is a county in the eastern Fujian Province, China, it is under the administration of the prefecture-level city of Fuzhou, the provincial capital.

History
Fire from the soldiers at Meicheng (then romanized "Min-tsing") turned back an expedition by Karl Gützlaff and Edwin Stevens to explore and evangelize in Fujian's tea country in 1835.

Division
Minqing County includes the towns of Meicheng, Bandong, Chiyuan, Meixi, Baizhang, Baizhong, Tazhuang, Dongqiao, Xiongjiang, Jinsha, and Shenghuang and the townships of Yunlong, Shanglian, Sanxi, Xiazhu, and Kulin.

Climate

Transportation
The county is served by Minqing North railway station on the Hefei–Fuzhou high-speed railway. The Nanping–Fuzhou railway passes through the county but there is no passenger service. The last passenger station, Minqing railway station, was closed in 2016.

References

 
County-level divisions of Fujian
Fuzhou